The Coptic Orthodox Church in Malaysia is an Oriental Orthodox Christian church in Malaysia. It comes under the episcopal jurisdiction of the Coptic Orthodox Diocese of Sydney and its Affiliated Regions, a diocese of the Coptic Orthodox Church of Alexandria.

The Coptic Orthodox Church in Malaysia currently has only one organised community in Malacca known as the St. Mary & St. Mark Church served by Fr. Joseph Sim, who was ordained on 15 March 2008.

The Coptic Orthodox Church in Malaysia is an affiliate member of the Council of Churches of Malaysia.

See also 
 Coptic Orthodox Church in Asia
 Coptic diaspora
 Orthodox Syrian Church in Malaysia

References 

Malaysia
Coptic

Coptic Orthodox Churches in Malaysia